The Christian Patriot movement is a subset within the broader American Patriot movement that promotes and emphasizes Christian nationalism as their core goal and philosophy. Like the larger movement, it promotes a revisionist interpretation of American history in which the federal government has turned against the ideas of liberty and natural rights expressed in the American Revolution.

Ideology
The movement originally referred to the late 1980s' Posse Comitatus group, a militant far-right organization.  The Posse Comitatus followed an ideology based on the teachings of its founder William Potter Gale, who was also a Christian Identity minister, and the majority of the Christian Patriot movement's members still adhere to Christian Identity's white supremacist views. This ideology holds the view that state and federal governments are agents of an arcane conspiracy to deprive Americans of their rights as "sovereign citizens." It also holds the view that this conspiracy can be undermined through various legal pleadings from English common law and other sources, such as a motion protesting the way a defendant's name is typeset in a legal complaint.
The ideology persists despite numerous court rulings that have declared its theories frivolous.

Status
The movement grew during the 1990s after the Ruby Ridge and Waco Sieges appeared to confirm the suspicions of Christian Patriots. The movement maintained its ties with the American militia movement of the same period. A highly publicized federal confrontation with Christian Patriots occurred in 1996, when Federal marshals arrested the Montana Freemen.

In 2009, the Southern Poverty Law Center said that militia groups may be experiencing a "Patriot revival."

See also
Tea party movement
Constitutional militia movement
Miles Christianus
Bo Gritz
Gordon Kahl
James Wesley Rawles
Alex Jones
American Redoubt
Christian Identity
Theoconservatism
Jon Arthur

References

Further reading

Aho, James (2016). Far-Right Fantasy: A Sociology of American Religion and Politics. New York & London: Routledge, Imprint of Taylor & Francis Group. .

1990s in the United States
Christian movements
Patriot movement
Political movements in the United States
Paramilitary organizations based in the United States
Paleoconservatism
Right-wing militia organizations in the United States
Sovereign citizen movement